Ophiodermella akkeshiensis is a species of sea snail, a marine gastropod mollusk in the family Borsoniidae.

Description

Distribution
This species occurs in the Pacific Ocean off Japan.

References

 Habe, Tadashige. "On the radulae of Japanese marine gastropods." Venus 20 (1958): 43–60.

External links
  Bouchet P., Kantor Yu.I., Sysoev A. & Puillandre N. (2011) A new operational classification of the Conoidea. Journal of Molluscan Studies 77: 273-308.

akkeshiensis
Gastropods described in 1958